Manfred Schöndorfer (born 28 October 1948) is a German former wrestler who competed in the 1972 Summer Olympics and in the 1976 Summer Olympics. He was born in Bad Reichenhall.

References

External links
 

1948 births
Living people
Olympic wrestlers of West Germany
Wrestlers at the 1972 Summer Olympics
Wrestlers at the 1976 Summer Olympics
German male sport wrestlers
Sportspeople from Upper Bavaria
People from Bad Reichenhall